The Teenage Show, also known as The Teenage Hour, is an Australian music television series which aired on Saturdays from 25 October 1958 to 1960 on Melbourne station HSV-7.

Background
The live series was a successor to Teenage Mailbag, and episodes ran for about an hour (though per TV listings, some episodes aired in a 55-minute time-slot). Heather Horwood, Jack Kelleher, and Gaynor Bunning were regulars. Bands also appeared, including The Moontones and The Rockets. The archival status of the series is unknown. In one episode, an Aboriginal boxer named George Bracken sang, and made enough of an impression to be signed by a label to release a single.

See also
 Teen Time, which aired on Sydney station ATN-7.

References

External links

Seven Network original programming
1958 Australian television series debuts
1960 Australian television series endings
Black-and-white Australian television shows
English-language television shows
Pop music television series
Australian live television series
Australian music television series